Ganyo is a village in Lahe Township, Naga Self-Administered Zone, in the Sagaing Region of northwestern Burma. It is located in the Naga Hills near the border with India.

References

External links
Maplandia World Gazetteer

Populated places in Naga Self-Administered Zone
Lahe Township